Henry Curwen (1528–1596) was an English landowner and Member of Parliament for Cumberland.

Career

He was a son of Thomas Curwen of Workington (died 1544) and Agnes Strickland.

In 1568 Mary, Queen of Scots came to Workington by boat as a fugitive after her defeat at the battle of Langside. She stayed a night at Workington Hall as a guest of Henry Curwen's family. Mary wrote to Elizabeth  from the Hall on 17 May, asking for assistance. An agate cup was treasured by the family as her gift to her hosts, known as the "Luck of Workington Hall". 

Henry Curwen was betrothed to Agnes Wharton, a daughter of Thomas Wharton, 1st Baron Wharton. He married Mary Fairfax, a daughter of Nicolas Fairfax of Walton. His family included a son, Nicholas Curwen (died 1605), who married, (1) Anne, daughter of Simon Musgrave, (2) Elizabeth Carus, a daughter of the lawyer Thomas Carus. Henry Curwen had two daughters; Joan Curwen married Christopher Musgrave, and Agnes Curwen married James Bellingham of Helsington.

In 1570 Henry Curwen and Simon Musgrave were knighted and joined an army led by the Earl of Sussex sent into Scotland to support Regent Moray against the supporters of Mary, Queen of Scotland in the west. Henry Curwen brought back an iron yett or gate from the Maxwell stronghold at Caerlaverock Castle which he displayed at Workington.

Curwen's second wife was Jane Crosby. Their children included George and Thomas Curwen.

The 1597 inventory of Workington Hall
An inventory of furnishings and farm stock was made in 1597, after the death of Henry Curwen. Bedrooms included the Green Chamber, the Tower Chamber (hanged with "Arras work"), the Dungeon Chamber, the Queen's Chamber (where Mary, Queen of Scots stayed), the Sill Chamber, the Bell Chamber, the Chapel Chamber, George Dyke's Chamber, a nursery, and the old Lady's Chamber, where there was a square table with a joint stool, a warming pan, and a "trundle bed" kept under the main bed. The hall was furnished with tables and benches, and two spears. The parlour was now a bedroom. Henry Curwen's clothes included velvet breeches and two old satin doublets. His bed chamber was over the courtyard gate.

References

1528 births
1596 deaths
People from Workington
Henry